Salawat Yulayev is an opera in four acts and seven scenes by the Bashkir composer Zagir Ismagilov.

The libretto was written by Bayezit Bikbay, based on stories from the life of the Bashkir national hero, Salawat Yulayev. Recent performances have broken the opera into two parts (part 1 – four scenes, part 2 – three scenes), rather than following the traditional act-based format. The role of Salavat Yulaev was originally sung by the first notable opera singer from the Bashkir region, Khabir Galimov. In subsequent performances, the opera singer Magafur Khismatullin sang the role.

Music 
Ismagilov used the Bashkir folk song, "Salavat" and the Russian folk song "Не шуми, ты, мать зелёная дубравушка" (Don't make noise, mother, green oak forest) within his score.

References

External links 
 
 
  – 2019 live production

1955 operas
Operas by Zagir Ismagilov
Bashkir-language operas
Operas set in the 18th century
Operas